This is the complete list of Olympic medalists in archery.

Current program
Competition format:
 FITA round (now known as '1440 Round') (1972–1988)
 Olympic round (1992–)

Men's events

Individual

Team

Women's events

Individual

Team

Mixed events

Team

Discontinued events
Early Olympic archery competitions (1900–1920) included events unique for each Games.

1900 Paris

1904 St. Louis

Men's events

Women's events

1908 London

Men's events

Women's events

1920 Antwerp

Statistics
The following table shows the most successful athletes in Olympic archery since 1972 by medals won:

References

International Olympic Committee results database

Archery
List of medalists

Olympic